The Mont and Harriet Johnson House, at 153 E 400 N in Springville, Utah, United States, is a Late Victorian-style house built in 1901. It was listed on the National Register of Historic Places in 1998. The listing included three contributing buildings.

It was built for Mont Johnson, a successful farmer who was prominent in Springville, who in fact was serving as mayor during 1900 to 1902, while the house was built.  He later served as treasurer of Utah County.  This house was grander than most previous buildings in the city, and was made of fired brick.

References

Houses on the National Register of Historic Places in Utah
Victorian architecture in Utah
Houses completed in 1901
Houses in Utah County, Utah
National Register of Historic Places in Utah County, Utah
Buildings and structures in Springville, Utah
Individually listed contributing properties to historic districts on the National Register in Utah